Myurella flavofasciata is a species of sea snail, a marine gastropod mollusk in the family Terebridae, the auger snails.

Description

Distribution
This species occurs in the Red Sea and in the Indian Ocean off the Mascarene Basin; also off Papua New Guinea.

References

 Bratcher T. & Cernohorsky W.O. (1987). Living terebras of the world. A monograph of the recent Terebridae of the world. American Malacologists, Melbourne, Florida & Burlington, Massachusetts. 240pp
 Terryn Y. (2007). Terebridae: A Collectors Guide. Conchbooks & NaturalArt. 59pp + plates.
 Severns M. (2011) Shells of the Hawaiian Islands – The Sea Shells. Conchbooks, Hackenheim. 564 pp.

Externaql links
 Pilsbry, H. A. (1921). Marine mollusks of Hawaii, VIII-XIII. Proceedings of the Academy of Natural Sciences of Philadelphia. 72: 296-328, pl. 12
 Fedosov, A. E.; Malcolm, G.; Terryn, Y.; Gorson, J.; Modica, M. V.; Holford, M.; Puillandre, N. (2020). Phylogenetic classification of the family Terebridae (Neogastropoda: Conoidea). Journal of Molluscan Studies. 85(4): 359-388

Terebridae
Gastropods described in 1921